The Justice Party was a political party in Burma.

History
The party was established on 3 November 1954 by former Supreme Court judge Aye Maung. He saw the party as the Burmese equivalent to the centre-right British Liberal Party.

It joined the National United Front, and Maung was elected to the Chamber of Deputies in the 1956 elections. However, Maung later became a supporter of Anti-Fascist People's Freedom League Prime Minister U Nu.

References

Liberal parties in Myanmar
Defunct political parties in Myanmar
Political parties established in 1954
1954 establishments in Burma